Obstructionism is the practice of deliberately delaying or preventing a process or change, especially in politics.

As workplace aggression
An obstructionist causes problems. Neuman and Baron (1998) identify obstructionism as one of the three dimensions that encompass the range of workplace aggression. In this context, obstructionism is "behaviors intended to hinder an employee from performing their job or the organization from accomplishing its objectives".

In politics

Obstructionism or policy of obstruction denotes the deliberate interference with the progress of a legislation by various means such as filibustering or slow walking which may depend on the respective parliamentary procedures.

As political strategy
Obstructionism can also take the form of widespread agreement to oppose policies from the other side of a political debate or dispute.

Mass media
In September 2010, Jon Stewart of The Daily Show announced the Rally to Restore Sanity and/or Fear, an event dedicated to ending political obstructionism in American mass media.

Tactics
The most common tactic is the filibuster which consists of extending the debate upon a proposal in order to delay or completely prevent a vote on its passage. 

Another form of parliamentary obstruction practiced in the United States and other countries is called "slow walking". It specifically refers to the extremely slow speed with which legislators walk to the podium to cast their ballots. For example, in Japan this tactic is known as a "cow walk", and in Hawaii it's known as a "Devil's Gambit". Consequently, slow walking is also used as a synonym for obstructionism itself.

Notable obstructionists

John O'Connor Power, Joe Biggar, Frank Hugh O'Donnell, and Charles Stewart Parnell, Irish nationalists; all were famous for making long speeches in the British House of Commons. In a letter to Cardinal Cullen, 6 August 1877, The O'Donoghue, MP for County Kerry, denounced the obstruction policy: "It is Fenianism in a new form." The tactic deadlocked legislation and 'the autumn Session of 1882 was entirely devoted to the reform of the Rules of Procedure with a view to facilitating the despatch of business.' Sir Leslie Ward's "Spy" cartoon of John O'Connor Power appeared in Vanity Fairs "Men of the Day" series, 25 December 1886, and was captioned "the brains of Obstruction".

A recent example is United States Senator Mitch McConnell. The Republican from Kentucky has gained notoriety for orchestrating numerous filibusters of federal judge nominations as Senate Minority Leader (2007-15, 2021-), and for repeatedly blocking such nominations as Majority Leader (2015-21). He has bragged about his obstructionism, referring to himself as the "Grim Reaper" of the Democratic agenda. He called the successful block of the Merrick Garland Supreme Court nomination "one of the happiest nights of [his] Senate career". According to former President Barack Obama, in one meeting between Vice President Joe Biden and McConnell about a piece of legislation blocked by the latter, McConnell stopped Biden's explanation of the merits of the bill, saying "you must be under the mistaken impression that I care".

See also
Filibuster
Justice delayed is justice denied

References

Human behavior
Political philosophy
Ethically disputed political practices
Abuse of the legal system